The Commission on HIV/AIDS and Governance in Africa (CHGA) was convened in 2003 by then UN Secretary General Kofi Annan under the leadership of Wilson Center Senior African Policy Scholar K. Y. Amoako, then the Executive Secretary of the United Nations Economic Commission for Africa (ECA).   

The Commission’s mandate was twofold: (i) clarify the data on the impact of HIV/AIDS on state structures and economic development; and (ii) assist governments in consolidating the design and implementation of policies and programs that can help to govern the epidemic.

Commission Members

Chairman K. Y. Amoako;
Patrons Kenneth Kaunda, and Pascoal Mocumbi; and 
Commissioners Seyyid Abdulai, Abdoulaye Bathily, Mary Chinery-Hesse, Awa Coll-Seck, Haile Debas, Richard G.A. Feachem, Eveline Herfkens, Omar Kabbaj, Milly Katana, Madeleine Mukamabano, Benjamin Nzimbi, Joy Phumaphi, Peter Piot, Paulo Teixeira, Bassary Touré, and Alan Whiteside.

CHGA Publications

In collaboration with the ECA, CHGA has published a number of background documents on various thematic areas related to its work programme. Material in these publications may be freely quoted or reprinted. These are available on the CHGA website

The Final Report: Securing Our Future

The Final Report advances current scholarship in HIV/AIDS policy and governance and is the culmination of a unique consultation by CHGA Commissioners with a wide constituency in Africa and beyond. The findings and recommendations not only embody deep analytical insights derived from the Commission’s own research, but also reflect the views of the more than 1,000 Africans—including senior policymakers, advocacy groups, nongovernmental organizations, community-based organizations, people living with HIV/AIDS, research organizations, and UN agencies—who took part in the consultation process. 

The report contains two volumes. The first is a 50-page policy summary, and the second is a 230-page technical volume supporting the core recommendations and key findings.  The Woodrow Wilson Center will publish the final report and distribute it at no cost with the support of the Bill & Melinda Gates Foundation.

HIV/AIDS in Africa